Hermes Volley Oostende is a volleyball team based in Ostend (Oostende), Belgium. The club was founded in 1955, but consisted only of one men's team until 1963, when also a women's team was erected.

The women's A squad currently plays at the highest level of Belgian volleyball, Ere Divisie. They have also achieved a spot in the 2011-12 Challenge Cup with their performances of the past season, they were third in the Belgian playoffs. Hermes Oostende also has a B squad in the first national league, the 2nd tier of the Belgian volleyball league pyramid. The C, D and E team play in lower provincial leagues.

At the men's side, Hermes Volley Oostende A plays in the highest Flemish league (the 4th tier of the Belgian volleyball league), aiming for promotion this season. The B squad plays in the second provincial league.

Honours (Women)

National competitions
  Belgian Championship: 13
1970–71, 1971–72, 1972–73, 1973–74, 1974–75, 1975–76, 1976–77, 1977–78, 1978–79, 1979–80, 1982–83, 1984–85, 1986–87

  Belgian Cup: 5
1970–71, 1971–72, 1976–77, 1981–82, 1982–83

2011–12 squads

Women

Hermes Volley Oostende A
Coach: Dries Wittebolle

Hermes Volley Oostende B
Coach: Bruno Remaut
Scouter: Celine Penson

External links
Official site 

Belgian volleyball clubs
Sport in Ostend